Affection is the fifth album by the American pop singer Jody Watley, released in 1995.

Track listing

Personnel

Jody Watley – vocals, background vocals
Yvette Cason – backing vocals
Keith Crouch – drums, Moog synthesizer, Moog bass
Kenneth Crouch – strings
Angelo Earl – acoustic guitar, electric guitar
Derrick Edmonson – keyboards, saxophone
Lili Haydn – violin
David Jackson – accordion

Rodney Lee – keyboards, Fender Rhodes
Glenn McKinney – guitar, keyboards
Morris O'Connor – acoustic guitar, guitar
Tory Ruffin – guitar
Stan Sargeant – bass guitar, electric bass
Dwight Sills – acoustic guitar
Brannen Temple – drums

Production

Producers – Derrick Edmonson, Jody Watley
Executive producer – Jody Watley
Engineers – Angelo Earl, Booker T. Jones, Chris Welton
Assistant engineer – Gene Lo
Mixing – Angelo Earl, Booker T. Jones, Chris Welton
Mixing assistant – Gene Lo
Mastering –: Steve Hall
Guitar programming – Derrick Edmonson
Instrumentation – Derrick Edmonson
Arrangers – Derrick Edmonson, Jody Watley
String arrangements – Kenneth Crouch
Art direction – Simon Halfon, Jody Watley
Photography – Michael Walls

Charts

Weekly charts

Singles

References

Jody Watley albums
1995 albums